

Storms
Note:  indicates the name was retired after that usage in the respective basin

 Tahmar (1981) – a moderate tropical cyclone that stayed out to sea.

 Talas
 2004 – a weak tropical storm that remained inland.
 2011 – a storm that caused severe damage in Japan.
 2017 – a tropical cyclone that impacted Vietnam during mid July 2017.
 2022 – brushed the coast of Japan, claiming 3 livess.

 Talim
 2005 – a strong Category 4 super typhoon that made landfall in Taiwan and China.
 2012 – tropical storm that affected the southern coast of China and hit Taiwan.
 2017 – a powerful Category 4 typhoon that through the Ryukyu Islands and made landfall on Kyushu.

 Tam (2006) – a weak tropical cyclone that caused minor damage in American Samoa.

 Tammy (2005) – a weak tropical storm that caused flooding throughout the East Coast of the United States, killing 10 people.

 Tanya
 1985 – made landfall in Queensland and then in the Northern Territory of Australia.
 1995 – a Category 1 hurricane that meandered around the central Atlantic
 1999 – a short-living severe tropical storm that stayed out at sea.

 Tapah
 2002 – a weak tropical storm that slightly affected the Philippines.
 2007 – not areas land.
 2014 – a powerful tropical storm that remained in the open waters of the ocean.
2019 – a storm that caused widespread rains and flooding in the Philippines.

 Tara
 1961 – a catastrophic Category 1 hurricane. 
 1968 – never threatened land. 
 1982 – never threatened land. 
 1982 – brushed southwestern Mexico.

 Tasha
 1990 – a severe tropical storm that caused flooding in southern China east of Hong Kong, resulting in 103 fatalities.
 1993 – a Category 1 typhoon that hit east of Leizhou Peninsula in China.
 2010 – a weak tropical cyclone that was short-lived but exacerbated widespread floods in Queensland, Australia, causing devastation.

 Tauktae (2021) – an extremely severe cyclonic storm was devastating landfall in Gujarat.

 Teddy (2020) – a Category 4 hurricane that affected both Bermuda and Atlantic Canada as a strong Category 1 hurricane and strong post-tropical cyclone, respectively.

 Tembin
 2000 – was not a threat to land while tropical.
 2005 – a weak tropical storm that once crossed the Philippines, it dissipated quickly.
 2012 – unusually approached Taiwan twice, first as a strong typhoon and second as a Category 2 typhoon.
 2017 – devastated southern Philippines, killing over 266 people.

 Teratai (2021) – a weak Category 1 tropical cyclone (Australian scale) which slightly affected Indonesia and Christmas Island.

 Teresa
 1994 – a Category 1 typhoon that caused.
 2021 – a weak and disorganized storm that stayed at sea.

  Tering
 1974 - struck the Philippines.
 1982 - struck Japan as a Category 1 typhoon.
 1986 - hit the Philippines.
 1990 - A super typhoon that did not affect land
 A Tropical Depression that was not tracked by the JMA.

 Terri (2001) – made landfall in the Pilbara region of Western Australia.

 Terry
 1976 – struck Madagascar and then hit the east coast of Mozambique and South Africa.
 1985 – a moderate Category 3 hurricane that churned in the open ocean. 
 2021 – formed at an unusually low latitude while staying at sea.

 Tess
 1945 – a Category 1 typhoon that made landfall in southern China.
 1953 – struck the Central Honshū Island in Japan. 393 people were killed and 85 were missing.
 1958 – a category 1 typhoon that only slightly affected the Ryukyu Islands.
 1961 – a powerful category 4 typhoon that remained in the open ocean.
 1964 – a powerful category 2 typhoon that remained in the open ocean.
 1966 – a Category 2 typhoon hitting China.
 1969 – a Category 1 typhoon that hit the Philippines and Vietnam.
 1972 – caused strong flooding and strong surf killed 29 people, with 20 missing.
 1975 – a category 2 typhoon that remained in the open ocean.
 1978 – a powerful tropical storm that remained in open waters.
 1982 – a weak tropical storm that affected China and Taiwan.
 1985 – a powerful Category 1 typhoon hits Philippines and Taiwan.
 1988 – was the second of three tropical cyclones to directly impact the Philippines in a two-week time frame in 1988.

 Tessa (1977) – caused significant precipitation over the islands, with the Puka Puka weather station recording a 24-hour rainfall total of 154.2 mm (6.07 in).

 Tessi – a severe tropical cyclone that caused extensive damage along the coast of North Queensland in 2000.

 Thane (2011) – was the strongest tropical cyclone of 2011 within the Bay of Bengal.

 Thelma
1951 – a Category 4 typhoon that was the strongest typhoons in the season, but did not affect the land.
1956 – a Category 5 typhoon that struck Philippines as a Category 2 typhoon in April.
1959 – a short lived tropical depression that was analyzed by JTWC as tropical storm.
1962 – a Category 4 typhoon that was formed from a fractured portion of a westerlies surge, later go on to affect Japan.
1965 – a short lived tropical storm that was analyzed by JMA as tropical depression.
1967 – a weak tropical storm that was formed in North Pacific Ocean, later would become a strong extratropical cyclone near Alaska.
1971 – a tropical storm that made a loop to the east of Philippines in March.
1973 – a tropical storm that struck southern Vietnam and dissipated in Gulf of Thailand. 
1977 – a Category 2 typhoon that brought destruction in southern Taiwan.
1980 – a tropical storm that was formed and stayed in the open sea.
1983 – a tropical storm that was the last named tropical cyclone of the 1983 Pacific typhoon season.
1987 – a Category 4 typhoon that was the first super typhoon of the 1987 Pacific typhoon season.
1991 – a tropical storm that overwhelmed Anilao–Malbasag watershed, causing devastation Ormoc City in Philippines with 4,922 deaths. 192 people were killed across Leyte and Negros Occidental, and 1,941–3,084 were missing and presumed dead, making Thelma deadliest Philippine tropical cyclone history until surpassed by Haiyan in 2013.
1998 – a Category 5 severe tropical cyclone that was the first Category 5 severe tropical cyclone observed in Timor Sea, and was the most intense tropical cyclone to threaten Darwin since Tracy.

 Three
 1891 – a Category 3 hurricane that made landfall in Martinique.
 1935 – a Category 5 hurricane that made landfall in Florida with the lowest recorded barometric pressure in the United States.
 1940 – a Category 2 hurricane that made landfall in the South Carolina and Georgia Coast.

 Tia
 1980 – affected Fiji and Tonga.
 1991 – the first of six tropical cyclones to affect Vanuatu during the 1991–92 South Pacific cyclone season.

Tico
1989 – a powerful major hurricane that made landfall in Mazatlán.

Tiffany
 1986 – Category 2 tropical cyclone (Australian scale), remained away from land in the Indian Ocean.
 1998 – Category 4 severe tropical cyclone (Australian scale), formed west of the Australian coast and moved out to sea. 
 2022 – Category 2 tropical cyclone (Australian scale), made landfall over Northern Queensland, crossed the Gulf of Carpentaria, then made landfall over the Northern Territory.

 Tina
 1974 – formed in late April.
 1990 – crossed western Australia.
 1992 – second longest-lived Eastern Pacific hurricane
1997 – a Category 2 typhoon that affected the Ryukyu Islands and South Korea.
 2016 – a short-lived, weak tropical storm.

 Tino
 2009 – a tropical depression that affected eastern Philippines.
 2013 – a Category 4 typhoon that later struck Japan.
 2017 – a tropical storm that affected the Philippines.
 2020 – a tropical cyclone which itself and an associated convergence zone caused significant damage across ten island nations in the South Pacific Ocean during January 2020.

 Tip
 1979 – a Category 5 super typhoon that was the largest and most intense tropical cyclone ever recorded.
 1983 – a Category 1 typhoon that affected Hong Kong.
 1986 – a Category 1 typhoon that stayed out at sea.
 1989 – a minimal tropical storm that remained well out at sea in September 1989.

 Tisoy
2003 – a Category 4 typhoon that stayed out at open sea.
2019 – struck the Philippines as a Category 4 typhoon, killing a total of 17 people.

 Titli (2018) – a deadly and destructive tropical cyclone that caused extensive damage to Eastern India in October 2018.

 Todd (1998) – a Category 4 super typhoon that mainly affected southern Japan.

 Tom (1996) – a Category 1 typhoon that did not affect land.

 Tokage
 2004 – the deadliest typhoon to strike Japan since Typhoon Bess in 1982.
 2011 – not affect.
 2016 – a Category 1 typhoon hits Philippines.
 2022 – remained out at sea.

 Tomas
 1994 – Category 3 tropical cyclone, remained over the open ocean.
 2006 – a weak tropical storm; the final storm of the 2006 typhoon season.
 2010 (March) – Category 4 tropical cyclone, caused extensive damage in Fiji.
 2010 (October) – a Category 2 hurricane that made the latest recorded landfall on Windward Islands and caused flooding in Haiti that intensified the cholera outbreak in the wake of earthquake earlier that year.
2018 – a Category 2 typhoon that made an anticyclonic loop because of weather systems late that season.

 Tony (2012) – a tropical storm that came from the tropical wave that also spawned Hurricane Sandy.

 Tonyo
2004 – struck Taiwan as a Category 3 typhoon.
2008 – a tropical storm that affected Vietnam.
2020 – a tropical storm that affected the Philippines and Vietnam.

 Toraji
 2001 – impacted Taiwan and China, killing at least 72.
 2007 – struck Vietnam.
 2014 – struck Japan.
 2018 – a weak system that struck Vietnam.

 Tracy (1974) – a Category 4 severe tropical cyclone that destroyed Darwin as well as the smallest tropical cyclone on record until 2008.

 Trami
 2001 – impacted Taiwan before crossing the island and dissipating in the strait as a depression.
 2006 – not a threat to land.
 2013 – caused flooding in the Philippines.
 2018 – a Category 5 super typhoon which affected Taiwan and Japan in mid-September.

 Trases
 2022 – struck the mainland of South Korea.

 Trevor  – A severe tropical cyclone that caused major damage across Papua New Guinea, Northern Territory and Queensland in 2019.

 Trina (2001) – a weak but destructive tropical cyclone in late 2001 which caused some of the worst flooding in the South Pacific island of Mangaia, Cook Islands, in nearly 50 years.

 Trix
 1952 – a Category 4 typhoon that devastated Bicol Region in Philippines killing 995 people, and as such was the 10th deadliest Philippine typhoon on the record.
 1957 – a Category 4 typhoon that made a sharp recurve to the east and would dissipate just over the International Date Line.
 1960 – a Category 4 typhoon that made a sharp turn to the south-west and hit northwestern Taiwan one week after Shirley causing more floods and four deaths.
 1963 – a Category 1 typhoon that made landfall as a tropical storm on Philippines and China in quick fashion.
 1965 – a Category 4 super typhoon that affected Japan just days after Shirley, killing 98 people and 9 were missing.
 1968 – a strong tropical storm that affected Kyūshū and Shikoku after a loop, killing 25 people.
 1971 – a Category 3 typhoon that affected much of Japan's southern coasts in most of its lifetime, causing 44 deaths and $50.6 million in damage.
 1974 – a weak tropical storm that made landfall east of Leizhou Peninsula, China.
 1978 – a Category 1 typhoon that made a loop in the middle of northwestern Pacific Ocean.

 Trudy
 1990 – a Category 4 hurricane that churned in the open ocean.
 2014 – a short-lived tropical storm that made landfall in Mexico.

 Tui (1998) – a weak tropical cyclone that affected American Samoa.

 Tuni (2015) – a weak tropical cyclone that slightly affected American Samoa.

 Tusi (1987) – a tropical cyclone which affected the island nations of Tuvalu, Tokelau, Western Samoa, American Samoa, Niue and the Southern Cook Islands during January 1987.

See also

European windstorm names
Atlantic hurricane season
Pacific hurricane season
Tropical cyclone naming
South Atlantic tropical cyclone
Tropical cyclone

References

General

 
 
 
 
 
 
 
 
 
 
 
 
 
 
 
 
 

 
 
 
 
 

T